Financial crime is  crime committed against property, involving the unlawful conversion of the ownership of property (belonging to one person) to one's own personal use and benefit. Financial crimes may involve fraud (cheque fraud, credit card fraud, mortgage fraud, medical fraud, corporate fraud, securities fraud (including insider trading), bank fraud, insurance fraud, market manipulation, payment (point of sale) fraud, health care fraud); theft; scams or confidence tricks; tax evasion; bribery; sedition; embezzlement; identity theft; money laundering; and forgery and counterfeiting, including the production of counterfeit money and consumer goods.

Financial crimes may involve additional criminal acts, such as computer crime and elder abuse and even violent crimes such as robbery, armed robbery or murder. Financial crimes may be carried out by individuals, corporations, or by organized crime groups. Victims may include individuals, corporations, governments, and entire economies.

Law enforcement often classifies larger forms of financial collusion as criminal syndicates.

Bribery 
The U.S. introduced the Foreign Corrupt Practices Act in 1977 to address bribery of foreign officials. This legislation dominated international anti-corruption enforcement until around 2010 when other countries began introducing broader and more robust legislation, notably the United Kingdom Bribery Act 2010. The International Organization for Standardization introduced an international anti-bribery management system standard in 2016. In recent years, cooperation in enforcement action between countries has increased.

Money laundering

For most countries, money laundering and terrorist financing raise significant issues with regard to prevention, detection and prosecution. Sophisticated techniques used to launder money and finance terrorism add to the complexity of these issues. Such sophisticated techniques may involve different types of financial institutions; multiple financial transactions; the use of intermediaries, such as financial advisers, accountants, shell corporations and other service providers; transfers to, through, and from different countries; and the use of different financial instruments and other kinds of value-storing assets. Money laundering is, however, a fundamentally simple concept. It is the process by which proceeds from a criminal activity are disguised to conceal their true origin. Basically, money laundering involves the proceeds of criminally derived property rather than the property itself.
Money laundering can be defined in a number of ways, most countries subscribe to the definition adopted by the United Nations Convention Against Illicit Traffic in Narcotic Drugs and Psychotropic Substances (1988) (Vienna Convention) and the United Nations Convention Against Transnational Organized Crime (2000) (Palermo Convention):

 
The Financial Action Task Force on Money Laundering (FATF), which is recognized as the international standard setter for Anti-money Laundering (AML) efforts, defines the term "money laundering" briefly as "the processing of criminal proceeds to disguise their illegal origin" in order to "legitimize" the ill-gotten gains of crime.

In 2005, money laundering within the financial industry in the UK was believed to amount to £25bn a year. In 2009, a United Nations Office on Drugs and Crime (UNODC) study estimated that criminal proceeds amounted to 3.6% of global GDP, with 2.7%  (or USD 1.6 trillion) being laundered. 

The Irish Department of Housing urged minister Darragh O’Brien to “ask in the strongest terms for the UAE to account for its relationship to Daniel Kinahan” a drug kingpin charged along with his brother, Christopher Kinahan in 2018 by the High Court of controlling and managing the daily drug operations in Ireland. The Kinahan brothers are sons of the Kinahan Cartel founder, Christy Kinahan Senior, who smuggled drugs and firearms into the UK, Ireland, and mainland Europe for a long. For several years, the Kinahan leadership had been residing in Dubai, where Daniel denied his involvement in organized crime by defending himself as a ‘high-profile businessman in the professional boxing industry’. According to Panorama investigation, Daniel has operated in the boxing industry through MTK and simultaneously operated Europe’s biggest money laundering, drug trafficking, and gangland executions networks from Dubai. A spokesperson for minister O’Brien said, “respect for human rights is a cornerstone of Ireland’s foreign policy,” when asked if the minister would raise the concerns regarding Daniel’s presence and operations in Dubai on his visit in March 2022 for St Patrick’s Day.

Fraud 
In 2005, fraud within the financial industry was estimated to cost the UK £14 billion a year.

Law enforcement agencies 
There are law enforcement agencies whose main enforcement activities focus on criminal violations of their country's tax code and related financial crimes, such as money laundering, currency violations, tax-related identity theft fraud, and terrorist financing. Some of these law enforcement agencies are:

 Australia - Australian Taxation Office 
 Canada - Canada Revenue Agency 
 Mexico - Unidad de Inteligencia Financiera
 Netherlands - Fiscale Inlichtingen- en Opsporingsdienst
 Nigeria - Economic and Financial Crimes Commission
 United Kingdom - Her Majesty's Revenue & Customs
 United States of America - Internal Revenue Service, Criminal Investigation

References

External links
Havocscope Black Markets - Database on black market activities such as money laundering and tax evasion.
Federal Bureau of Investigation - Financial Crimes Report to the Public
 EU financial crimes website
 International cooperation on money laundering and FATF 

Crime by type